Khalid Abdulla Al-Balochi (Arabic:خالد عبد الله البلوشي) (born 18 May 1997) is an Emirati footballer. He currently plays as a defender for Dibba.

Career

Al-Fujairah
Khalid Abdulla started his career at Al-Fujairah and is a product of the Al-Fujairah's youth system. On 31 August 2018, Khalid Abdulla made his professional debut for Al-Fujairah against Baniyas in the Pro League.

Khor Fakkan
On 31 May 2020, he left Al-Fujairah and signed with Khor Fakkan.

References

External links
 

1997 births
Living people
Emirati footballers
Emirati people of Baloch descent
Fujairah FC players
Khor Fakkan Sports Club players
Dibba FC players
UAE Pro League players
UAE First Division League players
Association football defenders
Place of birth missing (living people)